Beautiful Wave is a 2012 adventure coming-of-age drama film. The film was directed by David Mueller.

Plot
New Yorker late-teen Nicole (Aimee Teegarden) visits her estranged grandmother (Patricia Richardson) in Santa Cruz, California for the summer.  She learns family history, meets a boy, takes a road trip to Mexico, learns to surf, and discovers her missing-or-presumed-dead grandfather.

Cast
 Aimee Teegarden as Nicole Davenport
 Patricia Richardson as Sue Davenport
 Ben Milliken as Jeff
 Alicia Ziegler as Kayla
 David Thomas Jenkins as Danny
 Helen Slater as Jane Davenport
 Lance Henriksen as Jimmy Davenport / Baja Man

Professional surfer Holly Beck surfs in a non-speaking cameo role.

References

External links

 Official website
 Portfolio Films America 
 Beautiful Wave at the Internet Movie Database
 Piczo

2012 films
2012 direct-to-video films
American independent films
American coming-of-age drama films
2010s coming-of-age drama films
American surfing films
Films shot in California
Films set in California
Films set in Mexico
2012 drama films
2012 independent films
2010s English-language films
2010s American films